Lucerapex adenica is a species of sea snail, a marine gastropod mollusk in the family Turridae, the turrids.

Description
The length of the shell varies between 25 mm and 32 mm.

Distribution
This marine species occurs in the Gulf of Aden at depths between 270 mm to 1080 m.

References

External links
 Biolib.cz: Lucerapex adenica
 A.W.B. Powell, The family Turridae in the Indo-Pacific. Part 1. The subfamily Turrinae; Indo-Pacific mollusca, vol. 1 pages: 227--346

adenica
Gastropods described in 1964